Sir David Scott, 2nd Baronet, KH (25 July 1782 – 18 June 1851) of Dunninald Castle, Scotland, was a Scottish Tory politician.

Biography

Early life
David Scott was born on 25 July 1782,
the oldest son of David Scott (1746–1805) of Dunninald.
He was educated at Eton and a Trinity College, Cambridge.

His father a director the British East India Company, who put an agency for the company in trust for his son, to mature when he was 12. Young David entered that business.

Career
When his father died in 1805, Scott had expected to succeed him as MP for the Perth Burghs. However, by the time Scott left his father's beside, Sir David Wedderburn had already secured so much support that even the backing of Lord Melville was unable to prevent defeat.

As consolation for his defeat, it was arranged for him to be elected instead for another seat.
He was duly returned at a by-election in January 1806 as the Member of Parliament (MP) for the rotten borough of Yarmouth, Isle of Wight. He held the seat until the general election in November 1806, when he did not stand again.

After his 1805 defeat he sought a baronetcy for his mother's brother-in-law Sir James Sibbald, 1st Baronet of Sillwood Park in Sussex, which was granted in December 1806, with remainder to David. When James died without issue, David inherited the baronetcy and his uncle's estate. He then sold Dunninald to Patrick Arklay MP.

He was a Director of the East India Company from 1814 to 1818.

He was also a Knight of the Hanoverian Guelphic Order.

Death
He died on 18 June 1851. After his death, he was succeeded by his son, Sir James Sibbald David Scott, 3rd Baronet.

References

External links 
 

1782 births
1851 deaths
Members of the Parliament of the United Kingdom for English constituencies
Baronets in the Baronetage of the United Kingdom
UK MPs 1802–1806
People educated at Eton College
Alumni of Trinity College, Cambridge
Directors of the British East India Company
Tory MPs (pre-1834)